Abdul Awal Mintoo (born 22 February 1949) is a Bangladeshi businessman and politician. He has been chairman or managing director of a number of organisations and groups within Bangladeshi industry. He is the former president of the Federation of Bangladesh Chambers of Commerce and Industry (FBCCI).

Early life
Mintoo was born in a village named Aleyarpur in Feni District. He studied science at Feni Government Pilot High School in Feni where he earned his Secondary School Certificate (SSC) in 1964. He graduated from Comilla Victoria College in 1966 with a Higher Secondary School Certificate (HSC). In 1968, he obtained a diploma in nautical science from Mercantile Marine Academy in Chittagong, then known as Pakistan Marine Academy. He moved to the United States to pursue his studies and in 1973 graduated with a BSc in marine transportation science from the State University of New York Maritime College, following it up with a master's degree in transportation management and advance chartering problems and arbitration.

Career
Mintoo has been Director of National Bank Limited and General Insurance, the largest private general insurance company in the Bangladesh. He is chairman of the marketing and sole distribution of Johnson & Johnson Products in Bangladesh.

Within the Bangladeshi manufacturing sector, Mintoo has been director of the Chittagong Cement Clinker Grinding Co. Ltd. (Heidelberg Cement) and an advisor to Dulamia Cotton Spinning Mills Ltd. He is also active in agricultural-based industries, having served as Chairman of OP and Hybrid Vegetable seeds production, processing and research and has also been active in the following organisations:

Bangladesh India Chamber of Commerce and Industry (BICCI) Chairman
Bangladesh Association of Banks (BAB) Member, Executive Committee
Bangladesh Seed Merchants Association Adviser
Bangladesh Seed Dealers Association Chief Adviser
Bangladesh Employer's Federation President (1997–1999)
Bangladesh Ocean Going Ship Owners Association chairman (1988–2000)
Bangladesh Marine Fisheries Association EC Member (1992–1995)
Bangladesh Textile Mills Association EC Member (1995–1996)
Islamic Ship Owners Association (Jeddah) EC Member (1988–2000)
Bangladesh Garments Manufacturers & Exporters Association (BGMEA) Member, Council of Adviser

He has also been active in hotel groups in Bangladesh and has been a member of the Board of Governors, Academy for Planning and Development, Ministry of Planning, the Dhaka Stock Exchange (DSE) and the Bangladesh Olympic Association. He is a member of the National Bank Foundation and founded several colleges in Bangladesh including Iqbal Memorial College, Bodarernessa High School and Alhaj Safiullah High School. He is also a member of the Board of Governors, at Bangladesh Open University (BOU) and at the Bangladesh Institute of Management.

He was elected president of the Federation of Bangladesh Chambers of Commerce and Industry in 2003.

References

Further reading
 
 
 
 
 
 
 
 
 
 
 
 

1949 births
Living people
Bangladeshi businesspeople
Comilla Victoria Government College alumni
State University of New York Maritime College alumni
People from Daganbhuiyan Upazila